Eufaula Dam is a dam across the Canadian River in Oklahoma. Completed in 1964, it impounds Eufaula Lake, one of the world's largest man-made lakes, covering 102,500 acres (41,500 hectares). The dam serves to provide flood control, water supply, navigation and hydroelectric power generation. It supports a 90 MW power station; three generators produce 30 MW each.

History
State Highway 71 runs across the top of the dam.

The dam was approved by Rivers and Harbors Act of 1946 and construction began in December 1956. The cost of the project, completed by the U.S. Army Corps of Engineers, was $121,735,000. The flood-control operations of the dam were in place by February 1964, and the dam dedicated by President Lyndon B. Johnson on September 25, 1964.

This was the highest rate since 1990.

References

Dams in Oklahoma
Buildings and structures in Haskell County, Oklahoma
Buildings and structures in McIntosh County, Oklahoma
Hydroelectric power plants in Oklahoma
United States Army Corps of Engineers dams
Dams completed in 1964
Energy infrastructure completed in 1964